Angus Wright (born 11 November 1964) is an American-born British actor.

Life and career
Wright was born in Washington, D.C., the youngest child of Virginia and Patrick Wright. His father's career in the British Diplomatic Service took the family to the UK, the U.S., Lebanon, Egypt, Bahrain, Luxembourg, Syria and Saudi Arabia.

He gained an M.A. in Art History at the University of Edinburgh and then trained at the Central School of Speech and Drama. He has since worked extensively in theatre, film and television.

Film

Theatre

Television

Radio

Video games

References

External links

United Agents

1964 births
Living people
Male actors from Washington, D.C.
Alumni of the Royal Central School of Speech and Drama
Alumni of the University of Edinburgh
British male film actors
British male stage actors
British male television actors
Sons of life peers
20th-century British male actors
21st-century British male actors